Yevgeni Dmitriyevich Goryachev (born 16 January 1992) is a Russian former football player.

Club career
He made his debut in the Russian Second Division for FC Gornyak Uchaly on 5 September 2012 in a game against FC Lada-Togliatti Togliatti.

He made his Russian Football National League debut for FC Khimki on 8 April 2017 in a game against FC Yenisey Krasnoyarsk.

References

External links
 
 
 
 

1992 births
Sportspeople from Bryansk
Living people
Russian footballers
Association football defenders
FC Tom Tomsk players
FC Gornyak Uchaly players
FC Sibir Novosibirsk players
FC Khimki players
FC Olimp-Dolgoprudny players
FC Nosta Novotroitsk players